The Czech National Road Race Championships are held annually to decide the Czech cycling champions in the road race discipline, across various categories. The event was first held in 1994.

Men

Under-23

Women

See also
Czech National Time Trial Championships
National Road Race Championships

References

National road cycling championships
Cycle races in the Czech Republic
Recurring sporting events established in 1997
1997 establishments in the Czech Republic
National championships in the Czech Republic